Haft Kol (also known as Haft Gol) is a village in Mahur Rural District, Mahvarmilani District, Mamasani County, Fars Province, Iran. At the 2006 census, its population was 16, in 4 families.

References 

Populated places in Mamasani County